Mukendi is a surname. Notable people with the surname include:

Henoc Mukendi (born 1993), Congolese footballer
Ilunga Mukendi (born 1997), Congolese-born South African rugby union player
José Mukendi (1961-2006), Congolese footballer
Josué Alex Mukendi, Congolese politician
Mulumba Mukendi (born 1985), Congolese footballer
Olivier Mukendi (born 1991), Congolese-Belgian footballer
Pierre Kalala Mukendi (1939–2015), Congolese footballer
Vinny Mukendi (born 1992), British-born Congolese footballer